Pitak Kampita (born 12 February 1971) is a Thai judoka. He competed in the men's heavyweight event at the 1996 Summer Olympics.

References

1971 births
Living people
Pitak Kampita
Pitak Kampita
Judoka at the 1996 Summer Olympics
Place of birth missing (living people)
Pitak Kampita
Judoka at the 1998 Asian Games